Jean-Joseph Gaume (5 May 1802 – 19 November 1879) was a French Roman Catholic theologian and author.

Life
Gaume was born at Fuans, Franche-Comté.  While attached to the Diocese of Nevers, he was successively professor of theology, director of the petit séminaire, canon, and vicar-general of the diocese, and had already published several works, when he left for Rome in 1841.

Pope Gregory XVI made him a knight of the Reformed Order of St. Sylvester. A doctor of theology of the University of Prague, a member of several societies of scholars, honorary vicar-general of several dioceses, he received from Pope Pius IX in 1854 the title of prothonotary apostolic.

Works and the classics controversy

Gaume wrote numerous books treating of theology, history, and education. Those of the third gave rise to a debate the classics. The author blamed the Renaissance, as a resurrection of the paganism of antiquity, as the primal source of all the evil of his days. Such is the dominating idea of the works "Les Trois Rome" (1847), "Histoire de la societé domestique" (2 vols., 1854) and "La Révolution" (8 vols., 1856).

As a cure, it was necessary to devise a new method of moulding childhood and youth; this was to consist in catechetical instruction and the exclusion of pagan authors from classical studies. In support of this method he wrote  "Catéchisme de Persévérance, ou Exposé de la Religion depuis l'origine du monde jusqu'à nos jours" (8 vols., 1854); "La Religion et l'Eternité" (1859); "Traité de l'Esprit Saint (1864). To this series of works belong his "Manuel du Confesseur" (1*54) and "l'Horloge de la Passion" (1857), which he translated from St. Alphonsus Liguori.

The reform, or rather the revolution—the word is his—which he deemed necessary in classic instruction he had indicated as early as 1835 in his book "Le Catholicisme dans l'éducation", without arousing much comment. He returned to the subject in 1851 in a work entitled "Le Ver rongeur des sociétés modernes ou le Paganisme dans l'Education". The patronage of two influential prelates — Thomas-Marie-Joseph Gousset, Archbishop of Reims, and Pierre Louis Parisis, Bishop of Arras — and above all the articles of Louis Veuillot in "L'Univers", which supported Gaume from the first, gained for his views a hearing which they had previously failed to secure, and provoked a lively controversy among Catholics.

After having shown that the intellectual formation of youth during the first centuries of the Church and throughout the Middle Ages was accomplished through the study of Christian authors (ch. i-vi), Gaume proceeds to prove that the Renaissance of the sixteenth century perverted education throughout Europe by the substitution of pagan writers for Christian authors. In support of his thesis, he brings forward the testimony of men (viii-ix) and of facts (x-xxv), indicating the influence of classical paganism on literature, speech, the arts, philosophy, religion, the family, and society. Gaume did not go so far as to exclude the pagan texts; he allowed them some place in the three highest classes (the course comprised eight), but banished them from the first five years.

Consulted by the professors of his petit séminaire as to the course to pursue, the Bishop of Orléans, Félix Dupanloup, addressed them a letter on classical teaching, in which he declared himself in favour of the existing regulations and methods, thus preserving for the ancient authors the rank they had hitherto held, but at the same time assigned an important place to Holy Scripture, the Fathers, and modern authors. Sharply attacked by Veuillot in L'Univers, the bishop retorted by issuing a pastoral on the classics and especially on the interference of lay journalism in episcopal administration, and concluded by enjoining on the professors of his petits séminaires to receive no longer L'Univers. Then the question became even more burning; newspaper articles, brochures, pamphlets, even books succeeded one another on this question which created a general commotion among educationists. Gaume published in support of his thesis the Lettre sur le paganisme dans l'éducation. For a time it seemed as though the diocese were on the point of division.

At this juncture  Dupanloup drew up a declaration which was signed by forty-six prelates. It contained four articles, of which two dealt with journalism in its relations with episcopal authority, and two dealt with the use of the classics. It was therein stated:

that the employment of the ancient classics in secondary schools, when properly chosen, carefully expurgated, and explained from a Christian point of view, was neither evil nor dangerous;
that, however, the use of these ancient classics should not be exclusive, but that it was useful to join to it in becoming measure, as is generally done in all houses directed by the clergy, the study and explanation of Christian authors.

Gaume and his partisans lost no time in reducing their claims to the three following points:

the more comprehensive expurgation of pagan writers;
the more extensive ìntroduction of Christian authors;
the Christian teaching of pagan authors.

Nevertheless, it required instructions from Rome to put an end to this controversy. Gaume published further: "" (30 vols., 1852–55); "" (1857).

References

Attribution
 The entry cites:
Lagrange. Vie de Mgr. Dupanloup, II, vi, vii;
E. Veuillot, Vie de Louis Veuillot, II, xviii
L. Veuillot, Mélanges, Series I, vol. VI; Series II, vol. I;
Le  (1852), various articles.

External links
 
 

1802 births
1879 deaths
19th-century French Catholic theologians